Columbus-Belmont State Park, on the shores of the Mississippi River in Hickman County, near Columbus, Kentucky, is the site of a Confederate fortification built during the American Civil War. The site was considered by both North and South to be strategically significant in gaining and keeping control of the Mississippi River. It commemorates military actions that took place in both Columbus, Kentucky, and Belmont, Missouri across the river. This is 1 of 3 state parks in Kentucky that will be in the path of totality for the April 8th, 2024 total solar eclipse.

History

Confederate General Leonidas Polk fortified the area now occupied by the park beginning September 3, 1861. The fort at Columbus was built upon a bluff along the "cutside" of the river. The fort was christened Fort DeRussey, after an engineer supervising construction of fortifications, but Polk referred it as the "Gibraltar of the West". He had equipped it with a massive chain that was stretched across the Mississippi to Belmont, Missouri, to block the passage of Union gunboats and supply vessels to and from Southern destinations in the western theaters of the war. Equipped also with 143 cannons, Columbus was the northernmost Confederate base along the Mississippi, protecting Memphis, Vicksburg, and other key Southern holdings. As the northern terminus of the Mobile and Ohio Railroad, Columbus was logistically tied to Confederate supply lines.

Many of the earthen fortifications, buildings, and artillery pieces were lost to erosion of the bluff during heavy flooding in the region during the 1920s. When the flooding receded in 1925, the giant chain was exposed, and the people of Columbus decided to save it for future generations. The area containing the park was purchased by the state of Kentucky in 1934.

Attractions
The primary attraction in the park continues to be Polk's giant chain, which is estimated to have been more than a mile long before flooding and erosion destroyed part of it. Its anchor weighted between four and six tons and each chain link was eleven inches (279 mm) long. In 1934, during the Great Depression, the Civilian Conservation Corps built a stone monument to hold the chain.

Another attraction at the park is the "Lady Polk", the remains of a giant experimental cannon named for Polk's wife. However, repeated shots from the cannon heated and expanded the metal barrel, deforming it. When soldiers fired the last loaded but unfired shot from the Battle of Belmont two days later, the projectile was unable to escape the barrel. The cannon exploded into three pieces and killed 18 Confederate soldiers. A Federal newspaper soon after mocked that: "a person would be likely to consider himself as safe on one end [of the cannon] as the other."

Museum
A single surviving antebellum building at the park, once a farmhouse, served as a Confederate hospital during the early part of the war. The restored building is used as a museum and interpretive center for the Kentucky state park system. Exhibits focus on the Civil War history of the area and local natural and cultural history.  The museum is open daily from May through September, and on weekends in April and October.

See also
Fort Defiance (Illinois)
Battle of Belmont
Battle of Island Number Ten

References

External links
Columbus-Belmont State Park, Kentucky State Parks
Civil War Artillery in the News, Library of Congress
Interpreting the Civil War at Columbus-Belmont State Park and Sacramento, Kentucky: Two Case Studies by William H. Mulligan, Jr., Forrest C. Pogue Public History Institute, Murray State University

Battlefields of the Western Theater of the American Civil War
Kentucky in the American Civil War
State parks of Kentucky
Protected areas on the Mississippi River
National Register of Historic Places in Hickman County, Kentucky
Protected areas established in 1934
American Civil War museums in Kentucky
Museums in Hickman County, Kentucky
Civilian Conservation Corps in Kentucky
Protected areas of Hickman County, Kentucky
Parks on the National Register of Historic Places in Kentucky
Geography of Hickman County, Kentucky
1934 establishments in Kentucky
American Civil War on the National Register of Historic Places
Conflict sites on the National Register of Historic Places in Kentucky